The 1990 Nobel Prize in Literature was awarded to the Mexican poet and diplomat Octavio Paz (1914–1998) "for impassioned writing with wide horizons, characterized by sensuous intelligence and humanistic integrity." He is the only recipient of the Nobel Prize in Literature from Mexico.

Laureate

One of the best known works by Octavio Paz is El laberinto de la soledad ("The Labyrinth of Solitude", 1950), a collection of essays in which he analyzes Mexican history and culture. Paz has solely released poetry volumes up to this time including Piedra de Sol ("Sunstone", 1957). He started a number of literary publications, such as Vuelta and El hijo pródigo. Marxism, surrealism, existentialism, Buddhism, and Hinduism were just a few of the philosophies that had an impact on him. Love and sexuality were major topics in his later works. His works include the poetry collections Águila o sol? ("Eagle or Sun?", 1951), La Estación Violenta ("The Violent Season", 1956) and El Arco y la Lira ("The Bow and The Lyre", 1956).

Nominations
At the prize announcement in October 1990, Sture Allén permanent secretary of the Swedish Academy, revealed that there were 150 candidates for the prize in 1990, 25 of them women. Octavio Paz had been a candidate for the prize throughout the 1980s. Literary circles believed that among the nominees for that year were the perennial candidates such as Carlos Fuentes, another Mexican writer; Nadine Gordimer, a South African writer (awarded the following year); V. S. Naipaul, a Trinidad-born novelist who lives in Britain (awarded in 2001); Milan Kundera, a Czech novelist exiled in France; Max Frisch, a Swiss playwright; and Mario Vargas Llosa, a Peruvian writer (awarded in 2010).

Reactions
Octavio Paz had been expected to receive the award for years.  Paz himself said: "I was surprised because I didn't expect the prize. One or two years ago I knew I was a candidate, but this time, no. I didn't have the slightest idea, so I was doubly surprised."

References

External links
1990 Press release nobelprize.org
Award ceremony speech nobelprize.org

1990
Octavio Paz